Methanobacteria is a class of archaeans in the kingdom Euryarchaeota. Several of the classes of the Euryarchaeota are methanogens and the Methanobacteria are one of these classes.

Applications 
Methanobacteria can be used in biomass conversion as well as energy production through Anaerobic digestion (AD) process. Microbial community is used in Anaerobic digestion(AD) to convert organic wastes into clean energy by reducing chemical and biological oxygen demand in the wastes. Solid-state anaerobic digestion, which contains six genera of methanogens including Methanobacteria, can ferment rice straw and then produce methane. Since conventional treatment is burning rice straw in field, applying Methanobacteria to waste disposal process can reduce the air pollution caused by straw burning and also alleviate energy shortage problem, especially in rural areas. During biomethanation process, insoluble organic material and higher molecular mass compounds will first be transformed into simple carbon compounds. These break-down products will then be fermented to acetic acid, hydrogen and carbon dioxide. Eventually, the acetic acids can be fermented by different methanogenic bacteria to produce methane.

The product of Methanobacteria in human body can be used to test diseases. Methane in breath is produced by anaerobic methanobacteria in human colon as a metabolic end product. The status of Methanobacteria product detected in breath tests can be used to evaluate patients' particular gastrointestinal disorders. It is shown that the proportion of breath methane excreters among patients with colorectal cancer is much higher than that of normal people. However, methane breath status might be influenced by variable factors existing in diagnostic procedures, limiting the usage of breath methane test in cancer diagnosis.

See also
 List of Archaea genera

References

Further reading

Scientific journals

Scientific books

External links

Archaea classes
Euryarchaeota